Francesco Parisi may refer to:

Francesco Parisi (economist) (born 1962), Italian legal scholar and economist
Francesco Parisi (painter) (1857–1948), Italian-Argentine painter
Francesco Parisi (politician) (1930–2016), Italian politician